Beam stack search is a search algorithm that combines chronological backtracking (that is, depth-first search) with beam search and is similar to depth-first beam search. Both search algorithms are anytime algorithms that find good but likely sub-optimal solutions quickly, like beam search, then backtrack and continue to find improved solutions until convergence to an optimal solution.

Implementation 

Beam stack search uses the beam stack as a data structure to integrate chronological backtracking with beam search and can be combined with the divide and conquer algorithm technique, resulting in divide-and-conquer beam-stack search.

Alternatives 

Beam search using limited discrepancy backtracking (BULB) is a search algorithm that combines limited discrepancy search with beam search and thus performs non-chronological backtracking, which often outperforms the chronological backtracking done by beam stack search and depth-first beam search.

References 

Search algorithms